Billy Joe may refer to:

 Billy Joe (American football) (born 1940), American football player and coach
 Billy Crawford (born 1982), Filipino musician and actor
 Billy Joe Daugherty (1952–2009), American Christian pastor
 Billy Joe DuPree (born 1950), American football player
 Billy Joe Hobert (born 1971), American football player
 Billy Joe "Red" McCombs (1927–2023), American businessman
 Billy Joe Royal (1942–2015), American country and pop singer
 Billy Joe Shaver (1939–2020), American country singer-songwriter
 Billy Joe Tolliver (born 1966), American football player
 Billy Joe & the Checkmates, an American recording group in the 1960s formed by Lew Bedell

See also 
 Billie Joe (disambiguation)
 Billy Joel (born 1949), American rock musician

Compound given names